In Concert is a live album by the American folk music trio Peter, Paul & Mary, released in 1964 (see 1964 in music). It was compiled from concerts at San Francisco, Sacramento, Long Beach in California; Daytona Beach, Florida and Terre Haute, Indiana. Supporting the trio, Dick Kniss plays bass. It was digitally re-mixed and re-mastered and released on CD in 1989.

Track listing 

Side one
"The Times They Are a-Changin'" (Bob Dylan) – 3:16
"A'soalin'" (Paul Stookey, Tracy Batteste, Elena Mezzetti) – 5:28
"500 Miles" (Hedy West) – 3:02
"Blue" (Paul Stookey, Peter Yarrow) – 4:01
"Three Ravens" (Milton Okun, Paul Stookey, Mary Travers, Peter Yarrow) – 3:54

Side two
"One Kind Favor" (Blind Lemon Jefferson) – 3:12
"Blowin' in the Wind" (Bob Dylan) – 3:36
"Car-Car" (Woody Guthrie) – 5:01
"Puff, the Magic Dragon" (Peter Yarrow, Leonard Lipton) – 6:18
"Jesus Met the Woman" (Milton Okun, Mary Travers, Peter Yarrow) – 4:24

Side Three
"Le Déserteur" (Harold Berg, Boris Vian) – 4:32
"Oh, Rock My Soul" (Peter Yarrow) – 5:47
"Paultalk" (Paul Stookey) – 12:38

Side Four
"Single Girl" (Paul Stookey, Mary Travers) – 2:31
"There Is a Ship" (Milton Okun, Paul Stookey, Mary Travers, Peter Yarrow) – 3:00
"It's Raining" (Paul Stookey) – 5:23
"If I Had My Way" (Rev. Gary Davis) – 2:51
"If I Had a Hammer" (Pete Seeger, Lee Hays) – 2:35

Personnel
Peter Yarrow – vocals, guitar, recorder
Noel "Paul" Stookey – vocals, guitar
Mary Travers – vocals
Dick Kniss – bass
Technical
Lowell Frank - engineer
Barry Feinstein - photography

Chart positions

Notes 

Peter, Paul and Mary albums
1964 live albums
Albums produced by Albert Grossman
Warner Records live albums